The Letters of J. R. R. Tolkien is a selection of J. R. R. Tolkien's letters published in 1981, edited by Tolkien's biographer Humphrey Carpenter assisted by Christopher Tolkien. The selection from a large mass of materials contains 354 letters, dating between October 1914, when Tolkien was an undergraduate at Oxford, and 29 August 1973, four days before his death. The letters are of interest both for what they show of Tolkien's life and for his interpretations of his Middle-earth writings.

Contents 

The book has a 3-page introduction by its editor, Humphrey Carpenter. It notes that an "enormous quantity of material [had] to be omitted, and that only passages of particular interest could be included." The omissions include "the very large body of letters" written between 1913 and 1918 to Edith Bratt, the woman who became his wife. Carpenter notes that few letters from the period between 1918 and 1937 survive, and those "unfortunately" say nothing about the writing of The Silmarillion or of The Hobbit.

The body of the book consists of extracts from 354 of J. R. R. Tolkien's many letters. The first, dated October 1914, is to Bratt, when Tolkien was an undergraduate at Oxford. The last,  dated 29 August 1973, is to Priscilla Tolkien, his youngest child, four days before his death.

The letters are accompanied by detailed notes, and by an index compiled by the Tolkien scholars Christina Scull and Wayne G. Hammond.

The letters can be roughly divided in four categories:

 Personal letters to Tolkien's wife Edith, his son Christopher Tolkien, and his other children
 Letters about Tolkien's career as a professor of Anglo-Saxon
 Letters to his publishers at Allen & Unwin 
 Letters about Tolkien's Middle-earth writings

Letters 29 and 30 show that a German translation of The Hobbit was being negotiated in 1938. The German firm enquired whether Tolkien was of Arisch (Aryan) origin. Tolkien was infuriated by the racist implications of this, and wrote two drafts of possible replies for his publisher to choose. 

Having fought in the First World War, Tolkien wrote many letters during the Second World War to his son Christopher, including his reaction to the atomic bombing of Hiroshima, in which he calls the bombmakers of the Manhattan Project "lunatic" and "Babel builders".

In 1951, Tolkien hoped that Collins would publish both The Lord of the Rings and The Silmarillion. To help persuade them that the two were "interdependent and indivisible", he sent a letter (#131) to Milton Waldman of Collins, outlining the foundations and ambitions of his writings, and giving a potted history of the whole story from the creation, through the First, Second and Third Ages, and finishing with a reference to The Hobbit and a lengthy outline of The Lord of the Rings. The Tolkien scholar Colin Duriez describes the 10,000-word letter as "one of the best keys to the extraordinary legendarium".

Other letters discuss subjects as widely varied as the location of Middle-earth ("the actual Old World of this planet", p.220, #165), the shape of hobbits' ears ("only slightly pointed", #27) and the source of the "Downfall of Númenor" in Tolkien's recurring dream of Atlantis (#163).

Publication history 

The book was published in 1981 by Allen & Unwin in London. They reprinted it in 1990, 1995, and (having been taken over by HarperCollins) 2006. Houghton Mifflin published a paperback edition in Boston in 2000.

Reception 

Hannu Hiilos, reviewing the book, notes that the letters it contains had been chosen from "a very large volume of material". He comments that Humphrey Carpenter and Christopher Tolkien had attempted both to prioritise Tolkien's accounts of his Middle-earth writings, and to give a picture of the breadth of Tolkien's other interests and scholarship. In addition, he writes, Tolkien's views, coloured by his position on religion, morals, and politics, come across clearly in his wartime letters to Christopher.
The Tolkien scholar Douglas A. Anderson states that Carpenter "quietly withdrew from Tolkien scholarship" soon after publishing the Letters. Anderson states that he assisted Carpenter on Letters, "particularly with the headnotes and the annotations". The scholar of religion Peter Kreeft comments that the letters are important as all Tolkien scholars have to start by noting their interpretations of Tolkien's writings, unless they "dare to assume" they know better than Tolkien did what he may have meant.

Notes

References

Sources

External links 

 List of Published and Unpublished Letters at Tolkien Gateway

 Information and reviews about The Letters of J.R.R. Tolkien from Tolkien Library
 The Letters of J.R.R. Tolkien video on YouTube

Collections of works by J. R. R. Tolkien
Middle-earth books
1981 non-fiction books
Tolkien studies
Books published posthumously
Collections of letters
Allen & Unwin books